Robert Harold Whittaker (January 31, 1904 – June 5, 1990) was an American football player and coach of football and track.  He served as the head football coach at Bowling Green State University from 1941 to 1954, compiling a record of 66–50–7.

Head coaching record

College football

References

External links
 Bowling Green State University Hall of Fame profile
 

1904 births
1990 deaths
Bowling Green Falcons football coaches
Miami RedHawks football players
College track and field coaches in the United States
High school football coaches in Ohio
People from Greenville, Ohio